Council Directive 93/83/EEC of 27 September 1993 on the coordination of certain rules concerning copyright and rights related to copyright applicable to satellite broadcasting and cable retransmission is a 
European Union directive which governs the application of copyright and related rights to satellite 
and cable television in the European Union. It was made under the internal market 
provisions of the Treaty of Rome.

Satellite broadcasting 
An author has the exclusive right to authorise or to prohibit the broadcasting of his or her works by satellite (Art. 2). 
This right may only be subject to a compulsory licensing scheme when the satellite broadcast is simultaneous with a terrestrial 
broadcast [Art. 3(2)]. Satellite broadcasting is assimilated to terrestrial broadcasting for the purposes of related rights 
(rights of performers, phonogram producers and broadcasting organisations) (Art. 4): the protection of these rights is 
governed by Directive 92/100/EEC.

Cable retransmission 
The main effect of the Directive is to stipulate that cable retransmission must be on the basis of contractual, not 
statutory, licences with copyright holders, although existing statutory licence schemes were permitted 
to remain in force until the end of 1997 (Art. 8). These licences may only be granted or refused by 
collecting societies [Art. 9(1)], which effectively makes such societies compulsory: a 
collecting society may be deemed to be mandated to manage the cable retransmission rights of a copyright holder in the 
absence of any expressive agreement [Art. 9(2)]. Broadcasting organisations are free to exercise their own related rights 
to license or prohibit the cable retransmission of their own broadcasts (Art. 10). The Directive also provides for mediation 
in disputes between cable operators and collecting societies (Art. 11) and for measures to prevent 
abuse of monopoly powers (Art. 12).

Implementation

See also 
Copyright law of the European Union
Broadcast piracy

References 
 Council Directive 92/100/EEC of 19 November 1992 on rental right and lending right and on certain rights related to copyright in the field of intellectual property, OJ no. L346 of 1992-11-27, p. 61.

External links 
Text of the Directive
Report from the Commission on the coordination of certain rules concerning copyright and rights related to copyright applicable to satellite broadcasting and cable retransmission, 26 July 2002.

Copyright law of the European Union
European Union directives
1993 in law
1993 in the European Union